The women's individual recurve archery competition at the 2022 World Games took place from 10 to 12 July 2022 at the Avondale Park Historic District in Birmingham, United States.

Results

Ranking round

Elimination round
Pool A

Pool B

Finals

References 

Women's individual recurve
World Games